Justice Norton may refer to:

Edward Norton (judge), associate justice of the Supreme Court of California
Elijah Hise Norton, associate justice of the Supreme Court of Missouri
Milford Phillips Norton, associate justice of the Texas Supreme Court